Make a Fake is a 2011 Italian comedy film written and directed by Giovanni Albanese.

For his performance, Giuseppe Battiston won the Nastro d'Argento for Best Supporting Actor. The film was also nominated for the Nastro d'Argento for best comedy film.

Plot 
Arrogant and unscrupulous pasta factory owner Alfonso Tammaro tells his workers Enzo, Carmine and Bandula, that the factory will close and that they are laid off. When they ask if they can work in his new factory, he tells them he doesn't need them since it's completely automated. They are hard put to make ends meet, but Enzo's wife Aurora, who has been hired by Tammaro as a translator, convinces Tammaro to hire them as security guards at the old factory, which he now uses to store his latest enthusiasm, modern art. They find the art bizarre and the prices outrageously high. When Carmine accidentally breaks one of the artworks, they realize they have to create a duplicate, and find it surprisingly easy. Angry at Tammaro and desperate to improve their prospects, they decide to create duplicates and leave them for Tammaro, while selling the originals. They achieve some early success and become more ambitious. They travel to Rome to meet with a buyer who isn't too fussy about how they came into possession of such pieces, and Enzo is taken for a great new sensation in the art world. Put on the spot by a wealthy patron, he creates a new work by tracing the woman's hand with a pen and adding whatever bits of color he finds handy. For this "original" she gives him 1000€.

Alas, just when they have finished recreating an entire collection of modern art, the scheme goes awry. After they have switched their fakes for the genuine artworks, but before they can sell the real ones, Tammaro closes down the operation and sends the (fake) collection to Rome for auction. Terrified at being found out and sent to prison, they confess what they have done to Aurora, who helps them come up with a plan to undo their fraud by switching the art pieces at the auction site. They are unable to complete the swap, and are astonished to learn that in the world of modern art, it doesn't even matter. The film ends with them once again completely broke, except for the 1000€ Enzo made for his hand tracing, which they end up giving to Bandula so he can attend his daughter's wedding back in India.

Cast   
Vincenzo Salemme as  Enzo Gesumunno 
Giuseppe Battiston as  Carmine Bandiera 
Donatella Finocchiaro as  Aurora 
 Hassani Shapi as Bandula 
 Giulio Beranek as  Marcellino 
Sonia Bergamasco as The Financial Advisor
Paolo Sassanelli as  Alfonso Tammaro 
Ernesto Mahieux as  Don Elio 
 Mariolina De Fano as Carmine's Mother
 Dante Marmone as Natale
 Daniele Esposito as Savino 
Ninni Bruschetta as Ciccio Rizzuto

References

External links

2011 comedy films
2011 films
Italian comedy films
2010s Italian films